This Is Elvis is a 1981 American documentary film about the life of Elvis Presley, written and directed by Andrew Solt and Malcolm Leo. It combines archival footage with reenactments, and voice-over narration by pop singer Ral Donner, imitating Presley's speaking voice. It was screened out of competition at the 1981 Cannes Film Festival. The film grossed $2 million at the box office in the U.S. and Canada, ranking #92 for 1981.

Content 
For the reenactment scenes, Presley was portrayed in the film by four actors:
Paul Boensch II as Presley at age 11 (Tupelo, Mississippi, in 1946)
David Scott as Presley at age 18 (Memphis in 1953, singing in high school, and at a Sun recording session; vocals by David Scott)
Dana MacKay as Presley at age 35
Johnny Harra as Presley at age 42 (Opening credits, August 16, 1977 death scene from extended version)

Other narrators provided voice-over narrations for Vernon Presley, Gladys Presley, and Priscilla Presley. Presley's former road manager Joe Esposito and girlfriend Linda Thompson provided their own narrations. Presley receives credit only in the extended version prepared for cable and later home video release.

RCA Records released the soundtrack as a double LP album from the film in March 1981, featuring the first official release of several of Presley's 1950s television appearances as well as other previously unreleased performances. The soundtrack album was certified Gold on August 6, 2002 by the RIAA.

A two-disc DVD set of the film was released on August 7, 2007 commemorating the 30th anniversary of Presley's death. Disc 1 features the original version shown in theaters, Disc 2 includes the extended version with 45 extra minutes of footage.

This Is Elvis is the only Presley movie produced and released by Warner Brothers, until Baz Lurhmann’s biopic Elvis in 2022. Warner Bros. also currently owns other titles with Presley via purchasing Turner Entertainment, including Presley's Metro-Goldwyn-Mayer films and National General Pictures' Charro!.

Charts

Certifications

Reception 
In a contemporary review, Variety wrote, "A real curiosity item, This Is Elvis is a fast-paced gloss on Presley's life and career packed with enough fine music and unusual footage to satisfy anyone with an interest in the late singing idol."

References

External links 
 
 

1981 films
1981 documentary films
American documentary films
Documentary films about singers
Films about Elvis Presley
The Wolper Organization films
Films directed by Malcolm Leo
Films directed by Andrew Solt
1980s English-language films
1980s American films